Vinasat-2 (stylized all uppercase) is the second Vietnamese satellite to be placed in orbit. It was launched at 22:13 UTC on May 15, 2012 (5:13am on May 16 in the Vietnam time zone) at the European Spaceport in Kourou in French Guiana in South America and entered orbit 35 minutes later. VINASAT is the national satellite program of Vietnam. The project aims to bring independence in satellite communications for Vietnam, besides other benefits such as enhancing national security, opening new economic opportunities, etc.

Vietnam hopes for some economic benefits from the telecommunications links that the satellite will provide. It will provide communication for fishermen at sea, deliver weather forecasts and ensure defence security.
The satellite costs about US$280 million and weighing , was constructed by US-based Lockheed Martin. It will be able to provide capacity equal to 13,000 channels of telephone/internet/data communications or 150 Television channels; greater number of sensor responses; and higher bandwidth capacity.

The Lockheed Martin A2100 satellite has 12 Ku band transponders and 8 C band transponders.

See also
Vinasat-1

References

External links

  Vinasat-2 telecom satellite launched successfully.

Telecommunications in Vietnam
2012 in Vietnam
Spacecraft launched in 2012
Satellites of Vietnam
Communications satellites in geostationary orbit
Ariane commercial payloads
Satellites using the A2100 bus